This is a list of motorcycle rallies in Alaska and the Pacific Northwest region of the United States. Rallies are annual unless noted.

References

Lists of events in the United States
Pacific Northwest
Lists of festivals in the United States